The 1981–82 European Cup Winners' Cup was the 22nd season of the UEFA Cup Winners' Cup, a club football competition organised by UEFA for the national cup winners from each of its member associations. Spanish club Barcelona won the title for a second time after beating Belgian side Standard Liège 2–1 in the final at Camp Nou.

Preliminary round

|}

First leg

Second leg

Lokomotive Leipzig won 5–2 on aggregate.

First round

|}

First leg

Second leg

Second round

|}

First leg

Second leg

Quarter-finals

|}

First leg

Second leg

Semi-finals

|}

First leg

Second leg

Final

Top scorers

See also
1981–82 European Cup
1981–82 UEFA Cup

External links
 1981–82 competition at UEFA website
 Cup Winners' Cup results at Rec.Sport.Soccer Statistics Foundation
 Cup Winners Cup Seasons 1981–82–results, protocols
 website Football Archive 1981–82 Cup Winners Cup

3
UEFA Cup Winners' Cup seasons